County routes in Onondaga County, New York, are not signed in any form, serving as little more than references for inventory purposes. One county route, County Route 91 (CR 91), has route markers posted along its length; however, the signs display the number "57" for New York State Route 57 (NY 57), the road's former designation. Several route numbers comprise multiple highways, which do not always connect to one another.

Routes

See also

County routes in New York
List of former state routes in New York (401–500)

References

External links

Empire State Roads – Onondaga County Roads